The list of World Rally Championship seasons includes all seasons of the FIA World Rally Championship, from the inaugural 1973 season.

Seasons

References

External links

Seasons at World Rally Archive
Seasons at RallyBase

Seasons